Cathal Black is an Irish film director, writer, and producer.

Background
Black was born in Dublin, Ireland and grew up in Phibsborough. His father worked at the Guinness Brewery. Black's mother died when he was around 9 or 10 years old. His father remarried and the family moved to Galway for a period before returning to Dublin. Black has a twin brother.

Career
Black was elected as a member of Aosdána in 2000.

Filmography

Director
 2018 - Five Red Roses - one for every syllable of your name
 2014 - Butterfly (TV Short)
 2007 - Learning Gravity (aka the Undertaking)
 1999 - Love & Rage
 1995 - Korea
 1984 - Pigs
 1981 - Our Boys (Short)
 1976 - Wheels (Short)

Producer
 2018 - Five Red Roses - one for every syllable of your name (Documentary) (producer)
 2014 - Butterfly (TV Short) (producer)
 2012 - Irish Folk Furniture (Documentary short) (producer)
 1999 - Love & Rage (co-producer)
 1995 - Korea (executive producer)
 1976 - Wheels (Short) (producer)

Writer
 2007 - Learning Gravity (aka the Undertaking)
 1976 - Wheels (Short) (screenplay)

References

1952 births
Irish film directors
Irish film producers
Irish male screenwriters
Living people
Film people from Dublin (city)
21st-century Irish male writers
21st-century Irish screenwriters